Hongqiao Township may refer to the following locations in China:
 Hongqiao Township, Yunnan (红桥乡), in Ninglang Yi Autonomous County
 Hongqiao Township, Sichuan, in Wanyuan